Nyctonympha annulipes is a species of beetle in the family Cerambycidae. It was described by Belon in 1897. It is known from Bolivia and Peru.

References

Forsteriini
Beetles described in 1897